UFJ, which stands for the United Financial of Japan, is used in the former companies of UFJ Bank, UFJ Group, and UFJ Holdings. These related institutions disappeared after the merger of The Bank of Tokyo-Mitsubishi and UFJ Bank in 2005. UFJ Bank itself was established by the merger in 2002 of the Sanwa Bank, Tokai Bank, and Toyo Trust and Banking.

See also
 Mitsubishi UFJ Financial Group
 MUFG Bank

Banks of Japan
Mitsubishi UFJ Financial Group